Pınar Altuğ Atacan (born 2 September 1974) is a Turkish actress, TV presenter and former model. She is best known for family comedy "Çocuklar Duymasın" (2002-2019) which one of the longest Turkish series.

Education 
Altuğ studied at Saint-Benoît French High School. She started modeling while in high school. Her father died when she was 17 years old. Altuğ, who was elected Miss Turkey in 1994, stopped her education at Istanbul University School of Political Sciences, Department of Business Administration in 1997. She eventually pursued a degree in communication studies.

Career 
She started her career in television in 1995. Between 1995 and 1998, she worked as a presenter on various news-magazine programs. In 1999, she started presenting the food program Pınar'ın Yemek Zevki, after which she retired from modelling

In 2000, she was cast in the Kurt Kapanı TV series. She continued her career as an actress with roles in Çocuklar Duymasın, Omuz Omuza, Davetsiz Misafir and İlk Aşkım. In 2003, she released her first cookbook, titled Pınar'ın Mutfağından. From 2004 to 2006, she presented the Türkiye'nin Yıldızları contest. In 2010, she began taking part in the new season of comedy series Çocuklar Duymasın, for which she eventually a Golden Butterfly Award for Best Comedy Actress in 2018.

Personal life 
In 2000, she married Umut Elçioğlu but divorced after a few years. In 2008, she married actor Yağmur Atacan, who is nine years her junior. Their daughter, named Su, was born in January 2009.

Filmography

Television

Film

TV programs

Awards and nominations

References

External links 
 
 

Living people
1974 births
Actresses from Istanbul
Miss Turkey winners
Turkish female models
Turkish television presenters
Turkish television actresses
Turkish film actresses
Golden Butterfly Award winners